Marthe is a feminine given name. Notable people with the name include:

Marthe Armitage, British wallpaper designer
Marthe Bibesco (1886–1973), Romanian-French writer and socialite
Marthe Bigot (1878–1962), French schoolteacher and activist
Marthe Boyer-Breton (1879-1926), French artist
Marthe Bretelle (1936–1995), French athlete
Marthe Chenal (1881–1947), French opera singer
Marthe Cohn (born 1920), French resistance member and writer
Marthe Cnockaert (1892–1966), Belgian spy and writer
Marthe Cosnard, 17th-century French playwright
Marthe de Kerchove de Denterghem (1877–1956), Belgian feminist
Marthe Distel, French journalist
Marthe Djian (born 1936), French athlete
Marthe Donas (1885–1967), Belgian artist
Marthe Dupont (1892–1979), Belgian tennis player
Marthe Duvivier, 19th-century French opera singer
Marthe Enger Eide (born 1989), Norwegian sailor
Marthe Ekemeyong Moumié (1931–2009), Cameroonian writer and activist
Marthe Flandrin (1904–1987), French artist
Marthe de Florian (1864–1939), French courtesan
Marthe Gautier (born 1925), French pediatrician
Marthe Gosteli (1917–2017), Swiss suffragist and archivist
Marthe Hanau (1890–1935), French fraudster
Marthe Keller (born 1945), Swiss actress and opera director
Marthe Koala (born 1994), Burkinabé athlete
Marthe Kristoffersen (born 1989), Norwegian cross-country skier
Marthe Mellot (1870–1947), French actress
Marthe Mercadier (born 1928), French actress
Marthe Munsterman (born 1993), Dutch women's footballer
Marthe Niel (1878–1928), French aviator
Marthe Rakine (1904–1996), Canadian painter
Marthe Richard (1889–1982), French prostitute, spy and politician
Marthe Robert (1914–1996), French writer and translator
Marthe Robin (1902–1981), French Roman Catholic mystic and stigmatist
Marthe de Roucoulle (1659–1741), French Huguenot educator and salon holder
Marthe Servine (died 1972), French-American classical composer and pianist
Marthe Valle (born 1982), Norwegian singer-songwriter
Marthe Villalonga (born 1932), French actress
Marthe Vinot (1894–1974), French actress
Marthe Voegeli, Swiss physician
Marthe Vogt (1903–2003), German neuroscientist
Marthe Wéry (1930–2005), Belgian painter
Marthe Yankurije (born 1994), Rwandan long distance runner

See also
Martha (given name)

French feminine given names
Norwegian feminine given names